Cléirchén mac Murchadh (died 908) was King of Maigh Seóla.

Biography

Cléirchén appears only in the annals, and is not listed in any extant genealogies, so it is unknown if he had any descendants. He was the first of two sons of Murchadh mac Maenach to rule the kingdom. His name does not appear again in any branch of the Muintir Murchada. It did however appear as a surname among the neighbouring dynasty of Uí Fiachrach Aidhne by the 920's. It was the name of an obscure hermit (Cléircheán of Saintclerans) in the latter territory.

References

 West or H-Iar Connaught Ruaidhrí Ó Flaithbheartaigh, 1684 (published 1846, ed. James Hardiman).
 Origin of the Surname O'Flaherty, Anthony Matthews, Dublin, 1968, p. 40.
 Irish Kings and High-Kings, Francis John Byrne (2001), Dublin: Four Courts Press, 

 Annals of Ulster at CELT: Corpus of Electronic Texts at University College Cork
 Annals of Tigernach at CELT: Corpus of Electronic Texts at University College Cork
Revised edition of McCarthy's synchronisms at Trinity College Dublin.
 Byrne, Francis John (2001), Irish Kings and High-Kings, Dublin: Four Courts Press, 

People from County Galway
908 deaths
9th-century Irish monarchs
Year of birth unknown
10th-century Irish monarchs